The Place Diana is a public square situated in the 16th arrondissement of Paris, near the Seine river.

History 

The place is named in memory of Diana, Princess of Wales, by vote of the Council of Paris in 2018. The place is just north of the Pont de l'Alma Tunnel, where Princess Diana was killed along with two others (including her romantic partner Dodi Fayed) in a high-speed car crash in August 1997.

Features 

On this space rises the Flame of Liberty, a replica of the torch of the Statue of Liberty (Liberty Enlightening the World) in New York City. The statue was erected in 1989 to celebrate the Franco-American friendship. Somewhat forgotten, the Flame benefited from a renewed interest when Diana, Princess of Wales, died on 31 August 1997, during a road accident in the tunnel of pont de Alma, located below the monument.

Further reading

References

Squares in Paris
World Heritage Sites in France
National squares
Buildings and structures in the 16th arrondissement of Paris
Tourist attractions in Paris
Memorials to Diana, Princess of Wales